This is a List of New Zealand Women's One Day International cricket records, that is record team and individual performances in by the New Zealand women's national cricket team in One Day International (ODI) cricket. This list is based on the List of women's One Day International cricket records

Key
The top ten records are listed for each category. Tied records for the tenth place are listed as well. Explanations of the general symbols and cricketing terms used in the list are given below. Specific details are provided in each category where appropriate.

Team records

Team wins, losses, and ties

Matches played (total)

Matches played (by country)

Individual records

Individual records (batting)

Most career runs

Individual records (bowling)

Most career wickets

See also

List of women's One Day International cricket records
List of New Zealand One Day International cricket records

References

New Zealand cricket lists
Cricket records and statistics
One Day
Records